Soul Searchin' is the third solo studio album by Glenn Frey, the guitarist and co-lead vocalist for the Eagles. The album was released on August 15, 1988 on MCA in the United States and the United Kingdom, four years after Frey's successful album, The Allnighter and eight years after the demise of the Eagles. The album features eight original songs co-written by Frey with Jack Tempchin and the song "Two Hearts" contributed by Frey's friend, Hawk Wolinski. The album also features contributions from fellow Eagles member Timothy B. Schmit, Max Carl, Robbie Buchanan, Michael Landau, and Bruce Gaitsch.

The album was received negatively by the majority of music critics, while other reviewers noted good points to the album. It was also not as successful as Frey's previous albums (although one of his favorites), peaking at #36 on the Billboard 200, which marked the beginning of a downturn in Frey's fortunes on the album charts. The album's first and leading single, "True Love", unlike the album, was a commercial success, peaking at #2 on the Adult Contemporary chart, and so was the second single, the title track which peaked at #5 also on the same chart.

Background

Frey began work on the album in the midst of a string of hits in the 1980s, as well as animosity between him and other members of the Eagles. The album's title refers to his efforts to find his own identity.

Musical direction
When Frey was asked about his musical direction, he said "In a sense I'm working my way back home, Though I left Detroit and went to California to cut my teeth on country-rock, I've remained obsessed with the music of my adolescence, the great soul hits of the 60's and early 70's. It's a style that most black musicians have abandoned for dance music and rap. There are a whole lot of people who miss the sound of Sam & Dave, and Wilson Pickett. It's left a gap that is being filled by people like Steve Winwood."

Critical reception

Reviewing for AllMusic, critic William Ruhlmann wrote of the album "the songs here were so interchangeable with those on his first two albums he apologized for it in his note about "True Love," which became the album's sole Top 40 hit. The music was pleasant, but inconsequential, and suggested that Frey, living off his Eagles royalties, had come to think of his solo career as a hobby." In a review for The Rolling Stone Album Guide (1992), Mark Coleman gave the album one and a half out of five stars and wrote that "Frey sounded like he wasn't even trying anymore; his pump-your-body TV gym commercials at the time displayed more sweat and effort".

Track listing
All songs by Glenn Frey and Jack Tempchin, except where noted.

Personnel 

 Glenn Frey – lead vocals, backing vocals (1-4, 6-9), keyboards (1-5, 7, 8), guitar (1-7, 9), bass (1-7), percussion (1, 2, 4), arrangements (1), drums (2, 3, 7), horn arrangements (3, 7), string arrangements (5, 8), French horn arrangements (5)

Additional musicians
 David "Hawk" Wolinski – keyboards (1, 5, 7, 9), arrangements (1)
 Ron Skies – keyboards (2, 4, 5, 7, 10)
 Barry Beckett – keyboards (3, 8)
 Robbie Buchanan – keyboards (3, 9)
 Steve Thoma – keyboards (4, 7, 8, 10)
 Steve Nathan – keyboards (8)
 Michael Landau – guitar (2, 6, 10)
 Duncan Cameron – guitar (8), backing vocals (8)
 Bruce Gaitsch – guitar (9)
 Paul Jackson Jr. – guitar (9)
 David Hood – bass (8)
 Neil Stubenhaus – bass (9)
 Dave Chamberlain – bass (10)
 Russ Kunkel – drums (1, 5)
 John Robinson – drums (2, 4, 6, 9)
 Roger Hawkins – drums (8)
 Prairie Prince – drums (10)
 Steve Forman – percussion (1, 4, 5, 7)
 Ralph MacDonald – percussion (3, 6, 8, 9, 10)
 Bill Bergman – saxophone solo (1)
 Al Garth – saxophone (2)
 Chris Mostert – saxophone (3, 10)
 The Heart Attack Horns – horns (1, 3, 4, 7)
 Greg Smith – horn arrangements (1, 3, 4, 7)
 Nick DeCaro – string arrangements (5, 8, 10), French horn arrangements (5)
 Roy Galloway – backing vocals (2, 6, 8)
 Timothy B. Schmit – backing vocals (2, 6)
 Julia Waters – backing vocals (3, 4, 8)
 Maxine Waters – backing vocals (3, 4, 8)
 Max Carl – backing vocals (7)
 Oren Waters – backing vocals (8)
 Institutional Radio Choir – backing vocals (8)
 Carl Williams – BGV direction (8)

Production 
 Producers – Glenn Frey and Elliot Scheiner
 Co-Producers – Hawk Wolinski (Tracks 1, 5 & 9); James Newton Howard (Track 9).
 Production Coordinator – Ivy Skoff
 Engineers – Ray Blair, Dan Garcia, Alec Head, Glen Holguin, Jack Joseph Puig and Elliot Scheiner.
 Assistant Engineers – Ted Blaisdell, Jordan D'Alessio, Frank Dooken, Ken Felton, Mike Harlow, Robin Laine, Vickie Lancaster, Julie Last, Charlie Paakkari, Jim Singer and Paul Winger.
 Mixed by Elliot Scheiner at The Sandbox Studios (Fairfield County, CT).
 Digital Editing by Rhonda Schoen
 Mastered by Ted Jensen at Sterling Sound (New York, NY).
 Art Direction – Jeff Adamoff
 Digital Transfer – ImageDesign
 Design – DZN, The Design Group
 Photography – Dennis Keeley
 Management – The Fitzgerald Hartley Co.

Chart performance

Album

Singles

References

Classic Rock Sheet Music Hits. D Coates - 2004 - Google Books
October 10, 1988 Vol. 30 No. 15 Picks and Pans Review: Soul Searchin'
http://www.billboard.com/artist/glenn-frey/62230#/album/glenn-frey/soul-searchin/7349/review

External links

Glenn Frey albums
1988 albums
Albums produced by Barry Beckett
MCA Records albums
Albums recorded at United Western Recorders
Albums recorded at Capitol Studios
Blue-eyed soul albums